Dyschirius ferganensis is a species of ground beetle in the subfamily Scaritinae. It was described by Znojko in 1930.

References

ferganensis
Beetles described in 1930